Carlos Emanuel Romeu Lima (22 September 1972 – 16 October 2018), better known as Jonas, was an Angolan footballer who played for the Angola national team.

National team statistics

References

 

Living people
1972 births
Angolan footballers
Association football midfielders
Angola international footballers
Atlético Petróleos de Luanda players
Estrela Clube Primeiro de Maio players